Shaquai Mitchell (born 19 March 1996) is an Australian professional rugby league footballer who plays as a  for the South Sydney Rabbitohs in the NRL.

Background
Mitchell was part of the Sydney Roosters under 20s system where he won an SG Ball title in 2014 with his younger brother Latrell. Mitchell has played for the Wyong Roos in the NSW Cup, with a playing weight of 175 kg in 2018. As of 2022 Mitchell has dropped over 25 kg and training with the South Sydney Rabbitohs with a goal to play in the NRL, following his Indigenous All Stars debut.

Playing career
Mitchell made his debut for the Indigenous All Stars in the 2022 All Stars match. In round 8 of the 2022 NRL season, he made his first grade debut for South Sydney against Manly-Warringah at the Central Coast Stadium which ended in a 40-22 victory.

In Round 8 2022, Mitchell made his NRL debut for South Sydney against the Manly-Warringah Sea Eagles at Central Coast Stadium.

References

External links
South Sydney Rabbitohs profile
Indigenous All Stars profile

1996 births
Living people
Australian rugby league players
Indigenous Australian rugby league players
Rugby league players from Taree
Rugby league props
South Sydney Rabbitohs players